Lennard J. Davis, a nationally and internationally known American specialist in disability studies,  is Distinguished Professor of English at  the  University of Illinois at Chicago, School of Arts and Sciences,  and also Professor of Disability and Human Development in the School of Applied Health Sciences and  Professor of Medical Education in the University of Illinois College of Medicine.

His current interests include disability-related issues; literary and cultural theory; genetics, race, identity; biocultural issues, poverty, and representation theory.

He received degrees of B.A., M.A., and M.Phil. at Columbia University, as well as a PhD in the Department of English and Comparative Literature in 1976. His dissertation director was Edward Said.

Awards
 1996 Gustavus Myers Center for the Study of Human Rights' annual award for the best scholarship on the subject of intolerance in North America
 Guggenheim Fellowship for his book Obsession: A History
 National Book Critics Circle Nominee for My Sense of Silence, 2001
 Fulbright Recipient, lecturing in New Zealand at Victoria University of Wellington, University of Waikato, and Auckland University, 1994
American Council of Learned Societies Award 1986.

Publications

Davis is the author of works in a number of fields.

In English literature, he has written two works on the novel, Factual Fictions: The Origins of the English Novel (Columbia U. Press, 1983, rpt. University of Pennsylvania Press, 1996  ISBN) and Resisting Novels: Fiction and Ideology (Routledge, 1987, rpt. University of Pennsylvania Press, 2001) and been co-editor of Left Politics and the Literary Profession.

His works on disability include Enforcing Normalcy: Disability, Deafness, and the Body (Verso, 1995),  and The Disability Studies Reader (Routledge, 5th edition 2016). He edited an introduction to disability studies entitled Beginning with Disability: A Primer (Routledge, 2017)  A collection of his essays entitled Bending Over Backwards: Disability, Dismodernism, and Other Difficult Positions was published by New York University Press in August 2002. He is also the author of The End of Normal: Identity in a Biocultural Era (U of Michigan, 2014). His latest book is a history of the passage of the Americans with Disabilities Act titled Enabling Acts: The Hidden Story of How the Americans with Disabilities Act Gave the Largest US Minority Its Rights, published by Beacon Press in July 2015 on the 25th anniversary of that act.

His memoir My Sense of Silence (University of Illinois Press, 2000), was chosen Editor's Choice Book for the Chicago Tribune, selected for the National Book Award for 2000, and nominated for the Book Critics Circle Award for 2000. He has appeared on National Public Radio's "Fresh Air" to discuss the memoir, which describes his childhood in a deaf family.  Davis has also edited his parents' correspondence, Shall I Say a Kiss: The Courtship Letters of a Deaf Couple. (Gallaudet University Press, 1999).

Poornography or How Those with Money Write About Those Without It: Transclass, Endo-/Exo Writers, and Representational Inequality is his latest book to be published by Duke University Press in 2024. 

Davis is a co-founder of the Modern Language Association's Committee on Disability Issues in the Profession, and he is on the board of several academic journals.   Having written widely for newspapers and magazines, Davis is also the author of a novel entitled The Sonnets (State University of New York Press, March 2001).

His book Go Ask Your Father: One Man's Obsession with Finding Himself, His Origins, and the Meaning of Life Through Genetic Testing was published in 2009 by Bantam/Dell. Obsession: A History appeared in Fall 2009 by University of Chicago Press.

His fiction includes The Sonnets: A Novel (SUNY Press, 2002).

He has contributed numerous articles to The Nation, The New York Times, The Chicago Tribune, the Chronicle of Higher Education and other print media.

Davis has also been a commentator on National Public Radio's "All Things Considered," and appeared on "Morning Edition," "This American Life," "Odyssey," "The Leonard Lopate Show" and other NPR affiliates.

See also
Bioculture

References

Margaret Diehl, "Pounding at the Door" (Review of My Sense of Silence) in The New York Times "Sunday Book Review" (March 5, 2000)
Review of  My Sense of Silence by Melisa Siegler in Journal of Genetic Counseling, 2001
Review of "Bending over backwards" by Susan Squier, professor of Women's Studies and English at Pennsylvania State University

External links
Official faculty website, Dept. of English
faculty page at Project Biocultures
NPR talk
Lennard J. Davis's website
An Interview with Lennard J. Davis

Literary theorists
Disability studies academics
Year of birth missing (living people)
Living people
University of Illinois Chicago faculty
American academics of English literature
American disability rights activists
Columbia Graduate School of Arts and Sciences alumni
Columbia College (New York) alumni
DeWitt Clinton High School alumni